Coleophora pathana is a moth of the family Coleophoridae that is endemic to Afghanistan.

References

External links

pathana
Moths of Asia
Endemic fauna of Afghanistan
Moths described in 1994